Leroy Gopal (born 6 July 1979), is a Zimbabwe-born South African actor, comedian and a voice artist. He is best known for his roles in the films Yellow Card and Strike Back.

Personal life
He was born on 6 July 1979 in Harare, Zimbabwe. When Gopal was 14 years old, his father died. He has one elder sister, Claudia Gopal Muvuti is the former title holder of the Iron Woman Zimbabwe.. He completed primary education from Blackiston Primary School and then secondary education from Gateway High School and Prince Edward Senior School. He has a BA (Honors) degree in Live Performance and Motion Picture from AFDA, The School for the Creative Economy. He is one of two students to ever win the prestigious M-NET Student Of The Year award 2003 and 2004 consecutively.

Gopal is married to South African, Keletso Molefe since 2017. The couple has three children: Kiki Leroy Gopal, Didi Tadiwa, and Mimi Naima.

Career

In 2000, he made his maiden cinema appearance with the film Yellow Card where he played the lead role of soccer player 'Tiyane Tsumba'. From 2006 to 2007, he played the role 'Thabang Ngema' on the SABC 3 soap opera One Way which became highly popular. In 2012, he appeared in SABC 1's sitcom, Ses'Top La in the role as 'Oleshe'. In 2013, he won the award for the Best Actor in a comedy role at South African Film and Television Awards for this role. With the success and established as an accomplished actor, he was hired to act in the TV series Mzansi Love: Kasi Style in 2013. His role was a Kenyan man named 'Joshua Pembe'. He also acted in the short Through the Flight of a feather  which was screened at the Cannes Film Festival as well.

In the same year, he acted in the film Seal Team 8 as a Congolese dictator 'Tonga'. Then he made the appearance on TV series Mzansi Magic with the role 'Abomama' which became a popular character throughout the series. In 2014, he played in the SABC1 political series Ihawu le Sizwe. He later founded 'Creation Station Entertainment Company'. Leroy also directed a Zimbabwean music video for the singer Audius Mtawarira.

Filmography

References

External links
 

Living people
21st-century Zimbabwean male actors
1979 births
Zimbabwean male film actors
South African male actors